Kadri Tali (born on 18 June 1972 in Tallinn) is an Estonian conductor.

In 1996 she graduated from Estonian Academy of Music and Theatre in choir conducting speciality.

1992-2002 she conducted the choir Ellerhein. In 1997 she founded Nordic Symphony Orchestra.

Since 2011 she is the head of Estonian National Symphony Orchestra.

Her mother is mathematician Anne Tali. She has twin sister, Anu Tali who is also a conductor.

References

1972 births
Living people
Estonia 200 politicians
Estonian Academy of Music and Theatre alumni
Estonian choral conductors
Estonian conductors (music)
Estonian twins
Members of the Riigikogu, 2023–2027
Musicians from Tallinn
Tallinn Music High School alumni
Women conductors (music)